The Valle de los Ríos Apurímac, Ene y Mantaro, also known as the VRAEM, is a geopolitical area in Peru. It is one of the major areas of coca production in Peru. It's also the center of operation of the far-left terrorist group Shining Path, and the area is extremely poor.

The VRAEM is an area of such high childhood malnutrition and poverty that the government of Peru selected the VRAEM to launch its National Strategy for Growth program in 2007.

Cocaine production
Since 2012, Peru has overtaken Colombia as the world's largest cocaine-producing country. With local incomes below $10/day, the valleys are used to produce raw paste product, and much of the drug trade is controlled by the Shining Path. With an estimated  of production area (2010), it is presently the world's densest area of cocaine production. Paste product is shipped out of the valleys by armed native backpackers to Cuzco, and then onward shipped to either: the Pacific Ocean ports; the Bolivian border, where it is sold to one of the drug cartels; or to mule-traffickers who ship the product onwards via scheduled air transport to Europe and North America.

See also 
 Sivia
 Pichari

References 

Geography of Peru
Cocaine
Poverty in Peru